Hoseynabad (also Romanized as Ḩoseynābād) is a village in Piveh Zhan Rural District, Ahmadabad District, Mashhad County, Razavi Khorasan Province, Iran. At the 2006 census, its population was 456, in 124 families.

References 

Populated places in Mashhad County